Phrygica is a genus of gastropods belonging to the family Clausiliidae.

The species of this genus are found in Turkey.

Species:

Phrygica euxinaeformis 
Phrygica ilegiensis 
Phrygica jansseni 
Phrygica jelskii 
Phrygica raehlei 
Phrygica riedeli

References

Clausiliidae